DXJS (837 AM) Radyo Pilipinas is a radio station owned and operated by the Philippine Broadcasting Service. The station's studio is located near the Provincial Capitol, Brgy. Telaje, Tandag.

Last January 6, 2011, DXJS's transmitter tower was knocked down by heavy rains.

References

Radio stations established in 1995
Philippine Broadcasting Service
Radio stations in Surigao del Sur